Param Vir is a British composer originally from India.

Born in Delhi into a family life permeated with Indian classical music, Param Vir's strong interest in music developed as a teenager when attending a Roman Catholic secondary school and had informal lessons from composer Hans-Joachim Koellreutter, then resident in India. With no prospects as a composer in India, he read history and philosophy at Delhi University, but returned to music on graduation in 1974 as a teacher. From 1983 Vir studied composition at Dartington with Peter Maxwell Davies and at Guildhall School of Music and Drama with Oliver Knussen. In 1986 Vir was a composition fellow at Tanglewood. The following year he was a featured composer in the Festival of India in Geneva.

Career highlights
 1983 – attended Dartington International Summer School on a scholarship.
 1984 – moved to London to study with Oliver Knussen.
 1987 – awarded Benjamin Britten Composition Prize.
 1993 – Pierre Audi production of Broken Strings wins Ernst von Siemens Music Prize for young composers (Munich).
 2003 – first full production of ION tours Europe.
 2005 – Horse Tooth White Rock performed at the BBC Proms.
 2005 – Hayagriva commissioned and premiered by the Schoenberg Ensemble in Amsterdam
 2006 – Between Earth and Sky, inspired by Anish Kapoor's Cloud Gate, premiered by the BBC Symphony Orchestra in London
2008 – He Begins His Great Trance for the BBC Singers; Black Feather Rising for Stichting Octopus
2010 – Constellations for the BCMG performed at the Barbican
2013 – BBC Proms Commission Cave of Luminous Mind
2014 – Raga Fields – co-commission from Klangforum Wien, Fulcrum Point Chicago, the BCMG
2017 – international tour of A Kinsman to Danger
2020 – awarded PRS Composer Award for portrait CD on NMC

Selected works

Stage works

Other
 Before Krishna (1987; string orchestra)
 Horse Tooth White Rock (1994; orchestra)
 Ultimate Words: Infinite Song (1997; baritone, six percussion, piano)
 The Theatre of Magical Beings (2003; large ensemble)
 Hayagriva (2005; large ensemble)
 Between Earth and Sky (2006; orchestra)
 Cave of Luminous Mind (2013; orchestra) BBC commission for 2013 Proms
ABLAZE! (2014, soprano, piano)
Raga Fields (2014, sarod, mixed ensemble)
Drum of the Deathless (2017, percussion quintet or percussion duo)
A Kinsman to Danger (2017, baritone, piano)

Selected recordings
 White Light Chorale – Metronome METCD1053
Video extracts on the Param Vir official website

References

External links 
 Param Vir official website
 Param Vir's homepage at Chester Music

British opera composers
Male opera composers
Indian composers of Western classical music
Indian male composers
British classical composers
British male classical composers
20th-century classical composers
21st-century classical composers
1952 births
People from Delhi
Living people
20th-century British composers
21st-century British composers
20th-century Indian musicians
21st-century Indian musicians
Ernst von Siemens Composers' Prize winners
20th-century British male musicians
21st-century British male musicians